The Hollinwood Branch Canal was a canal near Hollinwood, in Oldham, England. It left the main line of the Ashton Canal at Fairfield Junction immediately above lock 18. It rose through four locks at Waterhouses (19–22) and another four at Hollinwood (23–26). Immediately above lock 22 at Waterhouses was Fairbottom Junction where the Fairbottom Branch Canal started. Beyond Hollinwood Basin there was a lock free private branch, known as the Werneth Branch Canal, to Old Lane Colliery, which opened in 1797. It is a biological Site of Special Scientific Interest and a Local Nature Reserve.

History
The Hollinwood Branch Canal was comparatively rural in character apart from mills and factories at Droylsden. Its main purpose was to carry coal from numerous local collieries to the many mills and factories in the neighbourhood of the Ashton Canal. Passengers were also carried along its length.

This canal was extensively used until about 1928 when trade began to decline rapidly due to competition from railways and roads. However, this was not the only problem as mining subsidence was becoming serious and it unofficially closed in 1932, although parts of it remained navigable. It was not until 1955 that most of it was officially closed and the short remaining section from the main line at Fairfield Junction was officially closed in 1961.

Future
Much of the line of the former canal remained intact, and there are now plans to re-open it as an amenity canal; these plans have the support of the local authorities. However, the problems of restoring this canal are far more challenging than those of restoring the Stockport Branch Canal. Not only is it suffering from the effects of mining subsidence but also its line has been severed twice by the Manchester ring road, which would require the construction of aqueducts to cross it. Another aqueduct would also be required to replace one across a railway that was demolished some time ago. The line up to Hollinwood Basin could not be restored because buildings now obstruct it but there are plans to connect the rest of it to the Rochdale Canal by means of a short new canal from just below the site of lock 23. Such a link was originally planned in 1792, but never constructed.

The first part of the restoration has started, with a £100 Million redevelopment scheme for Droylsden including housing, flats, restaurants, shops and offices, centred on a new marina which is connected to the line of the canal, and which was opened in September 2008. About  of canal from the junction with the Ashton Canal have been refurbished, and new waterside facilities for boaters are available near lock 18. The original plans would have blocked further restoration of the canal, but were changed after representations were made by the Hollinwood Canal Society, and the canal will now pass under a building which will span the route.

Features

The Hollinwood Branch Canal at Waterhouses is unique among Britain's canals and it is now part of the Daisy Nook Country Park owned by the National Trust. In  it included every type of canal feature, as well as some more unusual ones as well. Over this length these features were once to be found, starting and ending with road bridges over the canal:
A road bridge (Waterhouses Bridge)
A tunnel (Waterhouses, Boodle or Dark Tunnel). This was opened out in the 1920s.
A single-arched stone aqueduct over the River Medlock (Waterhouses Aqueduct)
A flight of four locks (19–22), the inner pair of which were staircase locks in that the top gates of the lower lock were also the bottom gates of the upper lock (Waterhouses Locks)
A small brick-built hut by lock 21 that is believed to have been used for the payment of wages
A canal junction where the Fairbottom Branch Canal started (Waterhouses Junction)
The towpath of the Fairbottom Branch Canal crossed the Hollinwood Branch Canal on a swivel bridge located across the head of lock 22.
An overspill weir crossed by the towpath on a low pier of stone blocks
A lock-keeper's cottage, which doubled as an office for the collection of tolls
A pumping engine (beam engine) used to back pump water from the canal below lock 19 to the canal above lock 22
A wooden flume over the pump house yard used to carry the water from the pump house back to the canal
A footbridge over the canal having a wrought-iron balustrade (Occupation Bridge)
A cast-iron aqueduct over Crime Lane (Crime Aqueduct)
A lake at the side of the canal that resulted from canal works at the time construction. As built, the canal severed the course of a brook and a culvert was made below the canal to accommodate this. A landslip blocked this and the waters were impounded on the offside of the canal. The new lake and canal became one and the lake was officially known as Crime Bank Reservoir but it is far better known by its later name of Crime Lake.
A road bridge (Crime Bridge)

Mention must be made of a neighbour of the pumping engine known as ‘Fairbottom Bobs’. This was a Newcomen steam engine (more accurately a Newcomen atmospheric engine) used to pump water from a coal mine.

In 1929 this engine was dismantled and taken to the United States by Henry Ford who had it completely restored. It was then placed at the Henry Ford Museum and Greenfield Village in Dearborn, Michigan.

Name

The name "Fairbottom Bobs" is older than the Newcomen engine. It was used to describe the pumps driven by water wheels driven by the River Medlock. The 'bobs' were L-shaped linkages designed to convert the circular motion of the wheels into an up-and-down pumping action. Early maps show the Newcomen engine as "Mr. Lees' Engine" and the Ashton Company had to negotiate with Mr. Lees (in 1798) to have the water redirected into the canal when it was built.

Points of interest

See also

Canals of the United Kingdom
History of the British canal system

References

Bibliography

External links
Hollinwood Canal Society
Pennine Waterways - Hollinwood Branch Canal

History of Greater Manchester
Sites of Special Scientific Interest in Greater Manchester
Canals in the Metropolitan Borough of Oldham
Canal restoration
Local Nature Reserves in Greater Manchester
Canals opened in 1796
Chadderton
1796 establishments in England